Jack & Millie is a radio sitcom written and created by Jeremy Front and directed and produced by David Tyler. It is centred around Jack and Millie, an older couple who are fully engaged with contemporary life while being at war with the absurdities of the modern world. The show stars real life brother and sister Jeremy and Rebecca Front, and is based on two devised characters that the siblings had been improvising for years.

The programme was first broadcast on BBC Radio 4 in 2017. The second series is currently in production with Pozzitive Television, to be broadcast in late 2020.

Episode list

Series one

Reception

The show was celebrated in the Jewish Chronicle as playing against stereotypes, and The Cambridge Geek praised the pilot episode, giving the series 4 stars and writing that "these two have been putting out good stuff long enough that they get an automatic listen".

References 

2017 radio programme debuts